Gustavo Romanello (born 11 September 1972) is an Argentine football manager and former player who played as a forward.

References

Living people
Association football forwards
Argentine footballers
1972 births
Montreal Impact (1992–2011) players
Villa Dálmine footballers
Sportivo Italiano footballers
Argentine football managers
Yaracuyanos F.C. managers
Footballers from Rosario, Santa Fe
Trujillanos FC managers
Club Petrolero managers